Charlie Fellows (born ) is an English rugby union player for Stourbridge in National League 1.

He plays on the wing. He previously played for Worcester Warriors.

He studied at King's School Worcester.

Notes

External links
 Worcester Warriors profile

1988 births
English rugby union players
Living people
Stourbridge R.F.C. players
Worcester Warriors players